LeForest Edgar "L. E." Potter (August 10, 1858 – May 1, 1942) was a member of the Minnesota Senate.

Biography
Potter was born on August 10, 1858 in Green Lake, Wisconsin. In 1885, he married Ada May Redford. They had three children. He died on May 1, 1942 at his farm near Springfield, Minnesota.

Career
Potter was a member of the Senate from 1915 to 1918, where he served on the Livestock Committee. Additionally, he was a member of the University of Minnesota Board of Regents from 1920 to 1922.

References

External links

People from Green Lake, Wisconsin
Minnesota state senators
1858 births
1942 deaths
People from Springfield, Minnesota